Old Malda Municipality is responsible for the civic administration of the Old Malda area under Malda Sadar subdivision of Malda district, West Bengal, India. This municipality was established in 1869 and is one of the oldest Municipalities in India.

Geography

Councillors
Councillor of O.M.M 2022- Incumbent

Councillor of O.M.M 2015-2020

Councillor of O.M.M 2010-2015

References

Municipalities of West Bengal